The Brunswick News, based in Brunswick, Georgia, United States,  is a daily newspaper in southeast Georgia. It was founded by the brothers C.H. Leavy and L.J. Leavy and began publication in 1902. The paper remains under the family ownership and is published Monday through Saturday. Brunswick News Publishing Co. also publishes Coastal Illustrated and Golden Isles magazine.

As well as local stories, it carries more international news than other local papers, with its source being the Associated Press wire.

References

External links
Official site

Newspapers published in Georgia (U.S. state)
Publications established in 1902
1902 establishments in Georgia (U.S. state)